Alloclita zelotypa is a moth in the family Cosmopterigidae. It was described by Edward Meyrick in 1918. It is found in Mozambique.

References

Endemic fauna of Mozambique
Moths described in 1918
Antequerinae
Moths of Sub-Saharan Africa
Lepidoptera of Mozambique